Laureldale is a borough in Berks County, Pennsylvania, United States. The population was 3,911 at the 2010 census.

Geography
Laureldale is at  (40.389293, -75.914150).

Transportation

No numbered highways pass directly through Laureldale. The main thoroughfares in the borough include Kutztown Road and Elizabeth Avenue, which intersect near the center of town. The nearest numbered highway is U.S. Route 222 Business, which passes just west of the borough.

Demographics

At the 2010 census there were 3,911 people living in the borough.  The racial makeup of the borough was 86.8% White, 2.5% African American, 0.4% Native American, 0.9% Asian, 0.0% Pacific Islander, 6.8% from other races, and 2.7% from two or more races. Hispanic or Latino of any race were 16.1%.

Gallery

References

Boroughs in Berks County, Pennsylvania
Populated places established in 1930